The Exhibition of National Portraits was a series of three grand exhibitions in London at the South Kensington Museum between 1866 and 1868. The first one opened in April 1866, and contained portraits of people from or linked to the history of England until the Glorious Revolution. The second exhibition displayed portraits between the Glorious Revolution and 1800, with the final exhibition showing portraits from people living after 1800, including living people. The second and third exhibition also included portraits that by right should have been present in one of the previous exhibitions, but weren't shown then. The third exhibition for example showed 9 works attributed to  Hans Holbein, 9 works by Anthony van Dyck, 27 by Reynolds and 34 by Gainsborough, even though they should normally have been shown in the previous exhibitions.

The 1866 exhibition, lasting from 16 April until 18 August, had 73,156 visitors for 1035 pictures, including works by Hans Memling and Hans Holbein the Younger. The 1867 exhibition, held between 2 May and 31 August, showed 866 portraits, many of them by Joshua Reynolds and Thomas Gainsborough, and received 49,385 visitors. The third exhibition opened on 13 April 1868, with 951 portraits. When it closed on 22 August, there had been 58,336 visitors. The catalogues of the three exhibitions sold over 16,000 copies for the first year, and over 8,000 copies each for the other two years.

Pictures included in the 1866 exhibition

Notes

Art exhibitions in London
Victoria and Albert Museum
Recurring events established in 1866
1868 disestablishments in England
1866 in London
1867 in London
1868 in London
1866 in art
1867 in art
1868 in art
1866 establishments in England